Muhammad Ibrahim Khan (پروفیسر محمد ابراہیم خان) is a Pakistani politician and deputy emir of Jamaat-e-Islami Pakistan since April 2019. Khan also served as a member of the Senate of Pakistan from March 2006 to March 2012.

He is also serving as president of Jamaat-e-Islami Khyber Pakhtunkhwa chapter since 19 April 2022.

References

Year of birth missing (living people)
Living people
Jamaat-e-Islami Pakistan politicians
People from Bannu District
Members of the Senate of Pakistan